Flame of the Argentine is a 1926 American silent action film directed by Edward Dillon and starring Evelyn Brent, Orville Caldwell and Frank Leigh. It was produced by Film Booking Offices of America, and was released in Britain by Ideal Films. It is now considered a lost film.

Synopsis
Doña Aguila owns a large ranch and a valuable emerald mine in Argentina, but her estate manager Emilio Tovar is trying to swindle her. On a visit to New Orleans, he persuades cabaret performer Inez Remírez to pose as Aguila's long-lost daughter. She returns with him and Doña Aguila it taken in by her, but Remírez is shamed by the older woman's kindness and refuses to help Tovar. He threatens her but she is rescued by American insurance agent Dan Prescott.

Cast
 Evelyn Brent as Inez Remírez  
 Orville Caldwell as Dan Prescott 
 Frank Leigh as Emilio Tovar  
 Daniel Makarenko as Marsini 
 Rosita Marstini as Madame Marsini  
 Evelyn Selbie as Nana  
 Florence Turner as Doña Aguila

References

Bibliography
 Lynn Kear & James King. Evelyn Brent: The Life and Films of Hollywood's Lady Crook. McFarland, 2009.

External links
 

1926 films
1920s action films
American silent feature films
American action films
Films directed by Edward Dillon
American black-and-white films
Lost American films
Film Booking Offices of America films
1926 lost films
Lost action films
Films set in Argentina
Films set in New Orleans
1920s English-language films
1920s American films